Route 322 is a state highway in west central Connecticut, running from Wolcott to Southington.

Route description

Route 322 begins at an intersection with Route 69 in Wolcott and passes through the town center as it curves east, southeast, and south to the southeast corner of the town.  It then turns onto Meriden Road, and descends into Southington, becoming Meriden-Waterbury Turnpike.  In Southington, it continues in a generally east-southeasterly direction just north of the Southington-Cheshire town line.  It intersects I-84 at exit 28, and then meets Route 10 at a grade separated intersection.  It briefly crosses into Cheshire before crossing the Quinnipiac River and reentering southeastern Southington.  It meets the southern end of Route 120 before ending at an interchange with I-691 near the Southington-Meriden town line.  The road continues into Meriden as West Main Street.

History
Route 322 was established in 1963, running from Route 69 to then US 6A (Meriden Road) in Wolcott. The year before becoming a signed route, Route 322 was taken over by the state and designated as unsigned SR 522 as part of the Route Reclassification Act. In 1967, with the decommissioning of US 6A, it was extended east along former US 6A to I-84 in Southington. In 1987, with the opening of I-691, the portion from I-84 to exit 4 of I-691 was transferred from Route 66 (which was truncated to I-91) to Route 322.

Junction list

References

External links

322
Transportation in Hartford County, Connecticut
Transportation in New Haven County, Connecticut
U.S. Route 6
Wolcott, Connecticut
Southington, Connecticut